Ayb School, is a private educational complex in Yerevan, Armenia, opened in 2011 by the Ayb Educational Foundation. The school is named after the first letter of the Armenian alphabet Ayb.

The school is a non-profit organization and functions as a foundation, legally registered as the Ayb Learning Hub Foundation. The motto of the school is "Know and Create".

The school is directed by the board of trustees, headed by Ruben Arutynyan. The director of the school is David Sahakyan.

History

Ayb Educational Foundation was established in 2006 to contribute to the development of education in Armenia. In 2010, the Government of Armenia allocated an area of 7 hectares for the realization of the Ayb School project. In 2011, the first section of the Ayb educational complex was opened.

At the beginning, the complex was opened as a secondary school. In 2013, the elementary section was opened. The middle section of the school will be ready for the 2014-2015 educational year. The school is the first in Armenia that integrates the best of Armenian educational traditions with the latest global technological resources.

In the near future, the complex will also have its own sports complex, art centre, media centre and the Church of the Holy Translators.

Mission

The Ayb Educational Foundation's goal is to establish schools in all the regional centers of Armenia, as well as a second school in Yerevan, and a school in Artsakh by the end of 2019. The curriculum applied within the AYB educational program is known as Ararat Baccalaureate, which is an Armenian-based international education system. It was initiated by the Ayb Foundation jointly with the Ministry of Education and Science of Armenia, within the frames of the National Education Excellence Program, in collaboration with the University of Cambridge and London Institute of Education.

Cooperation

In November 2014, Ayb Foundation initiated the Ararat Baccalaureate, a curriculum applied within the Ayb educational program as an Armenian-based international education system. It was set in collaboration with the University of Cambridge and the London Institute of Education.

In October 2016, Ayb School signed a memorandum of cooperation with the Goethe-Institut of Germany, within the framework of "Schools: Partners for the Future" initiative. The cooperation was facilitated through the efforts of the Ambassador of Germany to Armenia Mr. Bernhard Matthias Kiesler.

Education program
Ayb School offers an academic program called Araratian Baccalaureate (AB) that was developed by the Ayb Educational Foundation. The Araratian Baccalaureate is an academically rigorous high school qualification developed by the Ayb Foundation as part of the National Program for Educational Excellence, an Armenian public education program established by the Armenian Ministry of Education and Science and implemented in collaboration with leading international partners in the field of education.  On December 29, 2015, the Armenian Ministry of Education and Science confirmed the Araratian Baccalaureate as an alternative high school education program for Armenia's public school system. The AB program covers 8 subject areas, including mathematics, natural sciences, history, social sciences, and languages. The AB is benchmarked by UK National Recognition Information Centre (UK NARIC) to be comparable to GCE A Level and US Advanced Placement qualifications. Ayb School exercises a 100-point evaluation discipline. As well as giving marks, the teachers have to submit assessment reports with detailed information about the student’s progress. There are no gradebooks or academic diaries. Instead, each student’s progress is uploaded in a separate portfolio to Moodle system.

Project-based learning
Project-Based Learning is one of the distinguishing features of the Araratian Baccalaureate syllabus. It is an innovative educational model, which stems from the “learning by doing” principle adopted by Ayb School in 2015. The program builds the learning process around projects. This educational model enables students to set up teams and carry out large-scale and long-term projects to address actual community issues and challenges. It fosters important skills like teamwork, business thinking, responsibility, work planning and distribution, time management, prioritization, and many more. Project-Based Learning also helps students touch multiple facets and make future career choices. Annually, Ayb School has 10-12 project-based clubs, for example, Documentary Theater (theater arts), Podcasting, Fab Lab (robotics), Media Experts (media literacy), F8 (photography), Art Studio (illustration), Rockestra (orchestra), etc.

Statistics
In the 2020-2021 academic year, Ayb School had 477 students (as of September 1, 2021), among them citizens from both Armenia and abroad (10% of the total number). 86% of the students received tuition fee reimbursement. Ayb graduates are every year admitted to the world’s best universities.

References

Armenian schools
Educational institutions established in 2011
Schools in Armenia
2011 establishments in Armenia